The First United Methodist Church is a historic church building at Jefferson and Cross Streets in DeWitt, Arkansas.   It is a two-story red brick structure, designed Thompson & Harding and built in 1923.  It has a Classical Revival style portico supported by six unevenly spaced Tuscan columns.  The triangular pediment is fully enclosed, with a central oculus window.  The building is the third built for a congregation established in 1854–55, and the first built of brick.

The building was listed on the National Register of Historic Places in 1992.

See also
National Register of Historic Places listings in Arkansas County, Arkansas

References

Churches on the National Register of Historic Places in Arkansas
Neoclassical architecture in Arkansas
Churches completed in 1923
National Register of Historic Places in Arkansas County, Arkansas
1923 establishments in Arkansas
DeWitt, Arkansas
Neoclassical church buildings in the United States